Phoenix is the fifth album by the American singing trio Labelle. The album was moderately successful, peaking at #44 on the pop charts and #10 on the R&B charts. Only one minor hit was released, "Messin With My Mind", written by Nona Hendryx. The album is most notable for drifting away from the funk style of their previous album, Nightbirds, instead taking on a rock approach.

Track listing 
All tracks composed by Nona Hendryx; except where indicated
Side A
 "Phoenix (The Amazing Flight of a Lone Star)" (6:17)
 "Slow Burn" (3:32)
 "Black Holes in the Sky" (3:21)
 "Good Intentions" (3:57)
 "Far As We Felt Like Goin'" (2:58) (Bob Crewe, Kenny Nolan)
Side B
 "Messin' with My Mind" (4:36)
 "Chances Go Round" (Nona Hendryx, Edward Levone Batts, James Budd Ellison) (2:50)
 "Cosmic Dancer" (5:49)
 "Take the Night Off" (3:38)
 "Action Time" (Edward Levone Batts, James Ellison; with additional lyrics by Nona Hendryx) (3:51)

Charts

Personnel 
Nona Hendryx, Patti LaBelle, Sarah Dash - vocals
Edward Batts - guitar; acoustic guitar on tracks A5, B5
Carmine Rojas - bass guitar on tracks A4, B1, B5
James Ellison - keyboards
Larry Davis - drums
Jeffrey Shannon - percussion
with:
George Porter Jr. - bass on tracks A1 to A3, A5, B2 to B4)
Herman Ernest III - drums
Leo Nocentelli (tracks: A1, A2, A4, B1 to B5), Steve Hughes (tracks: A4, B1, B5), Teddy Royal (tracks: A2, A5) - guitar
Allen Toussaint - Fender Rhodes, arrangements
James Booker - organ
Carl Blouin - baritone saxophone
Jim Moore - tenor & alto saxophone, flute
Lon Price - tenor saxophone
Lester Caliste - trombone
John Longo - trumpet 
Steve Howard - trumpet, flugelhorn
Vicki Wickham - executive producer
Don Puluse, Ken Laxton - engineers
Tom Huetis - photography

References

External links 
 Phoenix on Discogs.com

1975 albums
Labelle albums
Albums produced by Allen Toussaint
Epic Records albums